Edward Slinger (born 2 February 1938) is an English former first-class cricketer, solicitor and judge.

Slinger was born at Accrington in February 1938. He was educated in the town at Accrington Grammar School, before going up to Balliol College, Oxford. After graduating from Balliol, he was admitted to practice as a solicitor in 1961. Although Slinger did not play cricket for Oxford University Cricket Club while studying at Oxford, he did feature for the Lancashire Second Eleven between 1963 and 1978, making 72 appearances in the Minor Counties Championship; despite his large number of appearances for the second eleven, he never featured for the first eleven. Slinger did however feature in one first-class match for the Marylebone Cricket Club (MCC) against Oxford University at Oxford in 1967. Batting once in a match heavily affected by poor weather, he scored 12 not out in the MCC's first and only innings. He was appointed a circuit judge in 1995, before retiring in 2010. He additionally sat as a member of the Parole Board for England and Wales from 2009, and is a governor of Westholme School.

References

External links

1938 births
Living people
People from Accrington
People educated at Accrington Grammar School
Alumni of Balliol College, Oxford
English solicitors
English cricketers
Marylebone Cricket Club cricketers
20th-century English judges
21st-century English judges
Lawyers from Lancashire